Allouez Township is a civil township of Keweenaw County in the U.S. state of Michigan. The population was 1,340 at the 2020 census.

Communities
It is the only incorporated municipality in Keweenaw County.
The community was founded in 1859 by the Allouez Mining Company to exploit the area's copper resources. A post office in Allouez began operating on October 16, 1873. The Allouez post office uses the 49805 ZIP Code, which serves the majority of Allouez Township and a small portion Calumet Township to the south.
The community is the site of a conglomerate dump from the former mining operations in the area.
Eagle River is an unincorporated community and census-designated place (CDP) located in the northern portion of the township.  According to the U.S. Census Bureau, the Eagle River CDP only occupies a minuscule  of Allouez Township and has no residents in this portion; almost all of the community is within Houghton Township.
The community was the site of the Forsyth Mine, which operated until 1847. The mine was operated on occasion by several other mining companies and also had a railway station along the Hancock & Calumet Railroad.
The Mohawk 49950 ZIP Code serves a very large portion of the Keweenaw Peninsula extending to Copper Harbor. The ZIP Code also uses the Eagle Harbor and Eagle River destination.
The community began as a station along the K. C. Railroad near the Gratiot River. The Ojibway Mining Company began operating in the area, and a post office operated briefly from February 15, 1908 until July 31, 1913. The community was named after the Ojibwe, an Anishinaabe Native American group that is indigenous to the area.

Geography

The township is in western Keweenaw County, on the northwest side of the Keweenaw Peninsula. It is bordered to the south by Calumet Charter Township in Houghton County, to the southeast by Sherman Township and to the east by Houghton Township in Keweenaw County, and to the northwest by Lake Superior.  The Black Creek Nature Sanctuary is also located within the township.

Major highways
 runs diagonally southwest–northeast through the township.
 runs concurrently with US 41 at this point of its route through the township.

Demographics
As of the census of 2000, there were 1,584 people, 710 households, and 430 families residing in the township. There were 973 housing units at an average density of 17.8 per square mile (6.9/km2). The racial makeup of the township was 98.93% White, 0.06% Native American, 0.13% Asian, 0.06% from other races, and 0.82% from two or more races. Hispanic or Latino of any race were 0.19% of the population. 44.6% were of Finnish, 8.7% German, 7.4% Italian, 6.9% English and 5.7% French ancestry.

There were 710 households, out of which 25.8% had children under the age of 18 living with them, 50.6% were married couples living together, 6.3% had a female householder with no husband present, and 39.3% were non-families. 35.5% of all households were made up of individuals, and 17.9% had someone living alone who was 65 years of age or older.  The average household size was 2.23 and the average family size was 2.92.

In the township the population was spread out, with 22.9% under the age of 18, 6.3% from 18 to 24, 24.2% from 25 to 44, 26.8% from 45 to 64, and 19.8% who were 65 years of age or older.  The median age was 43 years. For every 100 females, there were 103.6 males.  For every 100 females age 18 and over, there were 97.9 males.

The median income for a household in the township was $26,500, and the median income for a family was $34,904. Males had a median income of $26,034 versus $21,250 for females. The per capita income for the township was $14,974.  About 9.4% of families and 14.7% of the population were below the poverty line, including 15.6% of those under age 18 and 16.4% of those age 65 or over.

Education
The entire township is served by the Public Schools of Calumet located to the south in the village of Calumet in Houghton County.

References

Sources

External links
Official website

Townships in Michigan
Townships in Keweenaw County, Michigan
Houghton micropolitan area, Michigan
Michigan populated places on Lake Superior